The 2017–18 Scottish Lowland Football League (known as the Ferrari Packaging Lowland League for sponsorship reasons) was the fifth season of the Lowland Football League, the fifth tier of the Scottish football pyramid system. The season began on 28 July 2017 and ended on 8 May 2018. East Kilbride were the defending champions. 

Edusport Academy became the first club to gain promotion from the South of Scotland League, replacing Preston Athletic who were relegated to the East of Scotland League.

Spartans won the league on 14 April 2018, after a goalless draw with East Stirlingshire at Ainslie Park in their final match. They faced the winners of the 2017–18 Highland Football League (Cove Rangers) in the semi-finals of the League Two Play-offs, losing 5–2 on aggregate.

Teams

The following teams have changed division since the 2016–17 season.

To Lowland League
Promoted from South of Scotland League
 Edusport Academy

From Lowland League
Relegated to East of Scotland League
 Preston Athletic

Stadia and Locations

League table

Results

Lowland League play-off
A play-off took place between the winners of the 2017–18 East of Scotland Football League (Kelty Hearts) and the 2017–18 South of Scotland Football League (Threave Rovers) as both clubs met the required criteria for promotion. Kelty Hearts won 10–0 on aggregate to secure a place in the 2018–19 Lowland Football League.

First leg

Second leg

References

Lowland Football League seasons
5
Scottish